Freedom Fighters is a role-playing game published by Fantasy Games Unlimited in 1986.

Description
Freedom Fighters is a modern military system in which players are guerrillas battling the Soviet or space-alien conquerors of the United States. The game includes a GM's screen.

Publication history
Freedom Fighters was designed by J. Andrew Keith, with art by William H. Keith, Jr., and was published in 1986 by Fantasy Games Unlimited as a boxed set with a 96-page book, an 80-page book, a 32-page book, a cardstock screen, a sample character record sheet, and dice.

Freedom Fighters was one of the last role-playing games published by FGU.

References

Fantasy Games Unlimited games
Military role-playing games
Role-playing games introduced in 1986
Science fiction role-playing games